Jelša is a dispersed settlement in the hills above Velika Kostrevnica in the Municipality of Šmartno pri Litiji in central Slovenia. The area is part of the historical region of Lower Carniola. The municipality is now included in the Central Slovenia Statistical Region.

Name
The name of the settlement was changed from Jelše to Jelša in 1990.

Church

The local church is dedicated to Saints Hermagoras and Fortunatus and belongs to the Parish of Šmartno. It dates to the 17th century.

References

External links
Jelša at Geopedia

Populated places in the Municipality of Šmartno pri Litiji